The Pharmaceutical Society of Ghana was founded on December 19, 1935 out of the former Gold Coast Pharmacists and Druggists Union and the Chemists Defense Association which had existed before 1929. The Society was founded by a group of pharmacists led by William Ayiah Hansen, Hansdrug College of Pharmacy, Hansdrug Hall, Accra. He did so with the support of Dr. D. Duff, then the Director of Medical Services. William Ayiah Hansen was then the Organizing Secretary and Registrar of the Society. Before 1935, the predominant Pharmacists groups in Ghana were two associations. Pharmacists affiliated themselves to these groups according to their bonding or non-bonding to government service. The private pharmacists groups were led by William Ayiah Hansen.

Chapters
The Society has branches in all the Regions of Ghana except the Northern and Upper Regions which form one Branch. There are Hospital, General Practice and Industrial, Pharmacists Associations. The Ghana Pharmaceutical Students Association is affiliated to the Society.

Practice and Interest Groups
 Community Practice Pharmacists’ Association - CPPA
 Industrial Pharmacists’ Association - IPA
 Social and Academic Pharmacists’ Association - SAPA
 Government and Hospital Pharmacists’ Association - GHOSPA
 Associations of Representatives of Ethical Pharmaceutical Industries - AREPI
 Lady Pharmacists Association of Ghana - LAPAG

Statutory roles
The Society is tasked with the following:
 Promote a unified front among pharmacists in Ghana generally, and to secure the observance of high standards of professional conduct as will uphold the dignity of the profession of pharmacy
 Regulate the training of individuals desiring to become pharmacists, and to encourage the pursuit of research activities connected with the progress of pharmaceutical knowledge
 Disseminate scientific and professional information by means of lectures, symposia, seminars, the publication of the Society’s Journal, and by whatever means available to the Society within the laws of Ghana
 Encourage the exchange of ideas on and discussion of subjects of common interests to its members
 Co-operate with other pharmaceutical bodies outside Ghana with the aim of upholding high standards and dignity of the profession of pharmacy worldwide
 Organize meetings or other functions that will promote a good social intercourse among its members
 Place at the disposal of the Government and the general public the benefit of pharmaceutical expertise in keeping with the Society’s motto: “Amicus Humani Generis”
 Collaborate with the Government and all or any other agencies or bodies in Ghana to ensure that pharmaceutical services comparable to the best in the world is available to the people of Ghana
 Perform all other functions within the framework of the laws of Ghana, as may be found necessary for the achievement and realization of the foregoing objects or part hereof

Logo
The idea of a crest for the Society was proposed in 1962 but it was not until February 1971 when a design was ordered. The crest as it is today was accepted as the symbol of the Society on August 5, 1972.

Significance of Logo
 An outer ring, the Adinkra design; Obi nka obi (Peace and Harmony) which is in conformity with the Society’s motto (Amicus Humani Generis)
 Mortar and pestle with the recipe sign superimposed on the mortar representing the basic international designation of the pharmacy profession.
 Cluster of green leaves at the base of the mortar with a capsule superimposed on the leaves. The cluster of leaves represents the old and traditional concept of Pharmacy and denotes the numerous medicinal plants that abound in Ghana
 The superimposed capsule indicates the changing role of pharmacy from plant source to synthetic products. It also shows that pharmacists can extract the active principles from plants, formulate and dispense them in acceptable dosage forms

Membership
By virtue of Section 9, Act 64 of Ghana, every person registered as a pharmacist in Ghana automatically becomes a member of the Society. Membership had until the promulgation of Act 64 of Ghana been optional.
At its inception, membership was twenty six. In 1961 after the passage of Act 64, a new register opened. Membership then increased significantly to nearly four hundred and twenty. By December 1984, the number of pharmacists registered had reached eight hundred and five. Membership certificates were introduced in 1972 and have been available since then. The designation of membership is MPSGH. Associate membership is open to persons who have obtained their recognizable academic qualifications and are undergoing their registration process or pursuing postgraduate studies.

The National Council of the Society (Governing Body)
The body responsible for the day-to-day management of the affairs of the Society. Consists of the following member:

Standing Executive Committee
Consists of members elected by the Society at a biennial conference, alongside the President, Vice-President, the National Treasurer, the General Secretary, the Assistant General Secretary, the Editor of the Pharmaceutical Journal and two others

Ministerial Nomination
Two members nominated by the Minister of Health (Ghana) under Section 9 (5) of Act 64. The Director of Pharmaceutical Services and the Dean of the Faculty of Pharmacy, Kwame Nkrumah University of Science and Technology (KNUST), Kumasi, Ghana.

Elected Branch Representatives
Two from Greater Accra Region, one each from Eastern, Central, Western, Ashanti, Brong-Ahafo, Volta Regions and one from Northern and Upper East/Upper West Regions which form one Branch

Other
The immediate past President of the Society

The National Secretariat
This is the head-office of the Society and the seat of the current president and governing body. It was initially located at Selwyn Market Street, Accra. In 1956, a new office with a physical address was inaugurated at Knustford Avenue, near the Timber Market, Accra. Since 1972 the Secretariat has been moved four times. Now it is within the Social Advance Institute building near the Greater Accra Regional Administration.
On July 17, 1966 a collective decision was made to build a National Headquarters with the help of a fund launched by General Emmanuel Kwasi Kotoka. A Building committee was set-up by Council but unfortunately up to date, the building has not taken off. The Secretariat is currently being run by the General Secretary, his Assistant and aided by four staff members led by an administrative secretary.

Fellowship in the Society

Early Honorees
Five members had distinguished themselves in the service of the Society and practice of the pharmacy profession in Ghana
 Samuel Benson Adjepong, 1914-1984, a product of Chelsea College, first Director of Pharmacy of the Ministry of Health in Ghana
 Samuel Addotey Allotey, 1913-1984, became a member in 1941, was Treasurer from 1954-1963,General Secretary, from 1963-1971 of the Society, and served on the Pharmacy Board for 12 years
 James Ebenezer Kwasi Djan, 1918-1982, became a member in 1952, and soon the Vice-Chairman, Accra Branch and Treasurer of the Society from 1968-1971
 Bernard Eugene Dua Ofori-Atta, 1919-1976, became a member in 1940, was Vice- President from 1952-1966 and President 1966-1971
 Albert Nii Tackie, a product of Korle-Bu and Chelsea College, appointed Professor and head of Department of Chemistry, Faculty of Pharmacy and Pharmaceutical Sciences, KNUST, Kumasi, 1964 and later the Dean of the Faculty, a post he held until 1975 when he became the Executive Chairman, Council for Scientific and Industrial Research (CSIR). He is a fellow of the Pharmaceutical Society of Great Britain and a Chartered Chemist. He was a member of Council from 1957 to 1973.

Current Fellows
The Society now has eighteen Fellows including two members of the Pharmaceutical Society of Great Britain

Presidents
 William Ayiah Hansen- 1935
 J. E. Brown- 1935  
 Johnny Amarteifio- 1942 
 Johnny Hansen- 1944 
 G. O. Jones–Quartey- 1948 
 J. A. K. Quarshie- 1956 
 E. K. Bensah- 1961
 B. E.D Ofori–Attah- 1965 
 Victor Aidoo- 1971  
 Kwame Sarpong- 1974
 Ago Simmonds- 1975 
 James Pearce–Biney- 1981 
 K. A. Ohene–Manu- 1983
 E. O. Gyamfi- 1987
 K. Boakye–Yiadom- 1989
 David Anim–Addo- 1993
 Dela Ashiabor- 1997
 John Arthur- 1999
 Oscar Bruce- 2001
 Frank Boateng- 2003
 Alex Dodoo- 2007
 James Ohemeng Kyei- 2011
 Thomas Boateng Appiagyei- 2015
 Benjamin K. Botwe- 2017

Affiliations

West African Pharmaceutical Federation (WAPF)
Founding member

International Pharmaceutical Federation(FIP)
Member since 1962

African Pharmaceutical Forum 
Member of African Pharmaceutical Forum

West African Postgraduate College of Pharmacists 
Member of West African Postgraduate College of Pharmacists

Commonwealth Pharmaceutical Association 
Founding member of the Commonwealth Pharmaceutical Association

Association of Recognized Professional Bodies
Founding and active member of the Association of Recognized Professional Bodies

Representation
The Society is represented on several government committees concerned with Drugs and Health Administration in Ghana.
 Pharmacy Council Ghana
 Centre for Scientific Research into Plant Medicine
 National Health Insurance Council
 Drug Classification Committee of the Food and Drugs Board of Ghana
 National Population Council
 Ministry of Health (Ghana)
 National Health Insurance Scheme (Ghana) Medicines Expert Panel

Collaborating Agencies
 Royal Pharmaceutical Society of Great Britain (RPSGB)
 World Health Organization (WHO)
 West African Project to Combat AIDS (WAPCA)
 Ministry of Health (Ghana) (MOH)
 Faculty of Pharmacy and Pharmaceutical Sciences
 Ghana Pharmaceutical Students Association (GPSA)
 Ghana Aids Commission (GAC)
 DANIDA
 National Health Insurance Secretariat
 Ghana National Drugs Programme
 Malaria Control Programme
 Narcotics Control Board
 Ghana National Chemical Sellers Association
 Food and Drugs Authority
 Pharmacy Council Ghana

References
 Hansen, W.A. The First Handbook of the Pharmaceutical Society of the Gold Cost, 1936–37
 Davies, H. Ghana: Report of the Expert Adviser in Pharmaceutical Matters .1956-57
 Tackie, A.N. The Training of Pharmacists in Ghana
 The Ghana Pharmaceutical Journal Vol. 1, No. 3, Nov. 1973

External links
 Pharmaceutical Society of Ghana

Medical and health regulators
Medical and health organisations based in Ghana
Pharmacy organizations